Frans Geysen (born 29 July 1936) is a Belgian composer and a writer on music topics.

Biography
Frans Geysen was born in Oostham, and studied music at the Lemmens Institute in Mechelen, and at the conservatories of Antwerp and Ghent. In 1962 he became professor of harmony and analysis at the Lemmens Institute, and since 1975 has taught at the Royal Conservatory in Brussels.

Musical style
In 1962 he started using serial techniques, but in 1967 turned against the rhythmic aperiodicity and discontinuity characteristic of that technique. Instead, he began to use repetitive rhythmic structures similar to those of American minimalists such as Glass, Reich, Riley, and Young, though he developed these rhythmic ideas independently and retained the constructivism of serial thinking. He also continued to use twelve-tone rows often in his music, utilizing rows lacking thirds, perfect fifths, and semitones, in order to avoid suggestions of tonality and mutual attraction between pitches. His music is abstract, excluding emotion as either expression or goal. He explores a purposeful monotony, inspired by the monotony of the landscape of Flanders—and especially its easternmost province, Limburg, where he grew up. His compositions include theatrical works, choral and chamber music, the orchestral Staalkaarten voor een hoboconcert (1991), and many works for piano, organ, and carillon.

Writings
 1968. "Prognose voor een eucharistieviering". Adem: Tweemaandelijks tijdschrift voor liturgische muziek 2:50–53.
 1974. "Eigen compositorische bevindingen in vergelijking met het werk van de jonge Amerikaanse school". Adem: Driemaandelijks tijdschrift voor musikalischen Volkskunde 10, no. 1 (Jan-Feb): 24-30.
 1977. "De spiraalgedachte van Stockhausen en anderer componisten". Adem: Driemaandelijks tijdschrift voor musikalischen Volkskunde 13, no. 3:130–33.
 1981. "Olivier Messiaens Cinq réchants, een analytische benadering". Adem: Driemaandelijks tijdschrift voor musikalischen Volkskunde 17, no. 5 (Nov-Dec): 246–50. 
 1982. "Sporen der Middeleeuwen in hedendaagse Franse koormuziek". Adem: Driemaandelijks tijdschrift voor musikalischen Volkskunde 18, no. 1 (Jan-Feb): 26–28.
 1982. "Sporen der Renaissance in hedendaagse Europese koormuziek". Adem: Driemaandelijks tijdschrift voor musikalischen Volkskunde 18, no. 2 (Mar-Apr): 71–73. 
 1982. "Sporen van de barok in de 20ste-eeuwse muziek". Adem: Driemaandelijks tijdschrift voor musikalischen Volkskunde 18, no. 3:128–31.
 1982. "Sporen van het Classicistisch modulatiemodel in muziek van deze tijd". Adem: Driemaandelijks tijdschrift voor musikalischen Volkskunde 18, no. 4 (Sept-Oct): 181–85. 
 1982. "Sporen van Romantiek in muziek van deze tijd". Adem: Driemaandelijks tijdschrift voor musikalischen Volkskunde 18, no. 5 (Nov-Dec): 241–48. 
 1984. "Plastische Kunsten en Muziek van deze eeuw: Parallellie in de inspiratie, werkwijze, resultaat?" Adem: Driemaandelijks tijdschrift voor musikalischen Volkskunde 20, no. 1 (Jan–Feb): 15–20.
 1985. "Bach en het actuele componeren". Adem: Driemaandelijks tijdschrift voor musikalischen Volkskunde 21, no. 1 (Jan.–Mar.): 21–24.
 1985. "Wat Bach je doet? Een eindeloze cadens". Adem: Driemaandelijks tijdschrift voor musikalischen Volkskunde 21, no. 3 (July–September): 140–44.
 1986. "Het orgeloeuvre van Lucien Goethals". Orgelkunst 9, no. 2 (June):29-37.
 1987. "Ken het orgel een hedendaags componist nog in zijn ban houden?" Orgelkunst 10, no. 3 (Sept): 21–31.
 1988. "Analyse: Met het oog of met het oor?" Adem: Driemaandelijks tijdschrift voor musikalischen Volkskunde 24, no. 1 (Jan-Mar): 28–30. 
 1993. "Vier orgelstukken (1988-1992) of de niet aflatende verrukking". Orgelkunst 16, no. 3:124–37
 1994. "Bachs Preludium en Fuga in a". Orgelkunst 17, no. 1:21–34.
 2000. "Lucien Goethals' muziek voor orgel-solo". Revue belge de musicologie/Belgisch tijdschrift voor muziekwetenschap 54 (Liber amicorum Lucien Goethals): 179–88.

Compositions (selective list)

Music theatre
 Orpheus is in ons (libretto:  and Stefaan Decostere), television-opera in 4 acts (1988)
 Vuurvast, music theatre (1993)
 Wildzang, music theatre (1995)

Solo vocal
 Baadstertjes van biscuit, for soprano and piano (1998) 
 De lange tijd, for tenor and ensemble of early instruments (1975)
 Façade, for soprano and harp (1992)
 Gespiegelte, for female voice and organ (1971) 
 's Morgens is den riep zo kold, for voice and two flutes (1969)

Choral
 Alles heeft zijn tijd 7, for four-part mixed choir (or string quartet, or trumpet, oboe, clarinet, and bassoon) (2000)
 Alles komt terug 1, for SATB choir (1999) 
 Alles komt terug 2, for three-part choir (2000) 
 Alles komt terug 3, for SSATB choir (2000) 
 Als in roze mist, for a cappella choir (1979)
 Ballade van geen enkeling, for choir (1983)
 Dit heeft geen naam, for a cappella choir (1998)
 Doe, for a cappella choir (1981)
 Elementair, for a cappella choir (1969)
 (Extravagant articuleren als sublimerende taalautomaten), for a cappella choir (1995)
 Het gejuich der intervallen, for a cappella choir (1987)
 In, for a cappella choir (1979)
 In stromen van fysisch licht, for a cappella choir (1992)
 Ma weeral, for mixed choir (1981)
 Sine Nomine, for a cappella mixed choir (1971)
 Tunnel, for a cappella choir (1978)
 Vaarwel, for mixed choir (1993)

Orchestra
 Alles heeft zijn tijd 1, for orchestra (2000) 
 Energie ter plekke 1, for recorder quartet and string orchestra or string quartet (1997)
 Staalkaarten voor een hoboconcert, for oboe and orchestra (1991)
 Wentelingen, for chamber orchestra (1989)

Chamber music
 Alles heeft zijn tijd 7, for four-part mixed choir or string quartet or trumpet, oboe, clarinet, and bassoon (2000)
 Alles heeft zijn tijd 9, for 4 trumpets  (2000)
 Brass Quintet (1981)
 Le charme des impossibilités, for flute, violin and keyboard (1997)
 Energie ter plekke 1, for recorder quartet and string orchestra or string quartet (1997)
 Energie ter plekke 2, for brass quintet (1997) 
 Energie ter plekke 4, for brass ensemble (1997) 
 Erste begegnung, for tenor recorder and piano (1995)
 Grensverleggend grijs, for xylophone and marimba (1983)
 Hall-wand, for 5 trumpets and 3 trombones (1979)
 In het teken van de vertikale gloed, for six saxophones (1992)
 Jef Verheyen, le peintre flamant, for 5 trombones (1980)	
 Lappen-stuk, for harmonica, violin, double bass, piano, flute, oboe, clarinet, horn, bassoon (1980)
 Late spiegels, for flute, oboe, piano and double bass (1984)
 Met gekend elan, for tenor recorder (or flute or oboe), and organ (2002)
 Niet elke minuut duurt even lang, for recorder and marimba (1993)
 Omtrent h-c, for flute, oboe, clarinet, bassoon, trumpet, horn, trombone, and double bass (1979)
 Omtrent sib, for three oboes (1977)
 Op de fles, for four players on 16 bottles (2001)
 Prille ontmoeting, for tenor recorder and piano (1995)
 Slegov Erar, for recorder violin, cello, and piano (1972)
 Stadssteeg, for 6 oboes, 4 trumpets, 2 trombones (1977)
 Stemmingen, for trumpet and organ (1994)
 Stemmingen temeer, for trumpet and organ (1994)
 String Quintet, for 2 violins, viola, cello, and double bass (1976)
 Tijdsrekking, for alto recorder and piano or harpsichord (1999) 
 Titel-loos, for flute, violin, viola, and cello (1975)
 Vooralsnog, for horn, trumpet, trombone, and tuba (2004)
 Wind Quintet, for flute, oboe, clarinet, horn, and bassoon (1989)
 Woekering tot aan de grens, for recorder and piano or harpsichord (1992)

String quartet
 Alles heeft zijn tijd 2 (2000)
 Alles heeft zijn tijd 3 (2000)
 Alles heeft zijn tijd 6  (2000)
 Alles heeft zijn tijd 7, for four-part mixed choir (or string quartet, or trumpet, oboe, clarinet, and bassoon) (2000)
 Möbiusband 15 (2001)
 Niettegenstaande (2003)

Recorder ensemble
 Digitaal-Analoog-Identiek, for recorder duo, trio, and quartet (1986)
 F′′, for 12 recorders (1970)
 15 Duette, for two recorders (2003)
 Groot kwartetboek, 15 movements for recorder quartet (1992)
 Installaties [De Stockmansinstallaties], for recorder quartet (1983)
 Koken, for two recorders (1990)
 Langs hoeken en kanten, for recorder quartet (1990)
 Lichtspleten, for recorder quartet (1996)
 MAM, for recorder quartet (1972)
 Met zijn twaalven, for twelve recorders (2001)
 Nevel tot leven, for recorder trio (2002)
 Nonak, for recorder quartet (1972)
 Noodzaak van ommekeer—ommekeer van noodzaak, for recorder quartet (2004)
 Omtrent a-b-c, for recorder quintet (1984)
 Ottoflotto, for double recorder quartet (1995)
 Periferisch-Diagonaal-Concentrisch, for recorder quartet (1972)
 Vier korte stukken, for two recorders (1976)
 Wingerd in een natte zomer, for two recorders (1974)

Percussion ensemble
 Met vel, rand en tand, for three percussionists (2001)
 Monolieten 1, for three percussionists (1990)
 Monolieten 2, for percussion ensemble (1990)
 De volheid der tijden, for 3 × 3 drums (1981)

Solo instrumental

Piano
 Al op enen wintersen dag (2004)
 Denkbare muziek, for piano (1982)
 Endeavour, for piano (1971)
 Evident, efficiënt, consequent, for piano (1993)
 Fries (1981)
 Karel Goeyvaerts–Memoriaal, for piano (1994)
 Muziek voor toetsenbord, for piano (1977) 
 Muziek voor toetsenbord 2, for piano (1999–2000) 
 Voorstuk in paars (1990)
 Waarheen?, for piano (1998)
 Waarom niet nog? (2006)
 Wereld van volheid (1992)

Carillon
 Alles komt terug 4 (2000)
 Aug-Dim (1985)
 Clock-wise (1973)
 Drieluik (1994)
 Media vita (1982)
 Onstuitbaar-onweerlegbaar (1999)
 De overbodige illusies (1996)
 Playing the Bells out of Tower (1978)
 Probabiliter (1983)

Organ
 Caleidoscopia musica (2003)
 Crypta musica per florentini organum (1991)
 De gestage groei (1992)
 De grote variatie (1975)
 Herman Roelstraete–Memoriaal (1989)
 In nomine (1978)
 De klank van ruis (1974)
 Orgelstuk (1977)
 Twee-delingen (1999)
 Twee orgels, for two organs (1984)

Unspecified keyboard instrument
 A + B = A/B (1984)
 Alles heeft zijn tijd 4 (2000)
 Alles heeft zijn tijd 5 (2000)
 Alles heeft zijn tijd 8 (2000)
 Alles komt terug 5 (2000)
 Benadering van de kern (2000)
 Evident, efficient, consequent (1993)
 50 x Hedwig Speliers (1985)
 Intuitief, wel standvastig (1993)
 Toetsenstuk voor Lucien Goethals (1996)
 Toetsing (2000)
 Tonen-Trappenhuisje voor Hanne (1984)
 Wereld van volheid (1992)

Wind instruments
 City of Smiles, twenty solos for one recorder player, playing soprano to bass (2001)
 Ehrung an M.C.E. (E=mc2), for alto recorder (2001) 
 Geproesterol, for alto recorder (1994)
 Jef Verheyen–Memoriaal, for trombone (1989)	
 Kleine vegetatie, for alto recorder (1974)
 Pentakel, for oboe (1977)
 Solo, for alto recorder (1992)
 Solo per solum, for bassoon (1992)
 Stuk in groen, for clarinet (1990)

String instruments
 Solo per solam, for violin (1991)

Percussion
 Kataloog in grijs 1, for marimba (1984)

Electronic music
 Voorlopige stadia van een gegeometriseerde tijd, for tape (1989)

Sources

External links
 Geysen biography on CeBeDeM website.
 Koninklijk Conservatorium Brussel now houses most works and manuscripts of Geysen, after the bankruptcy of CeBeDeM in 2015.

1936 births
Living people
20th-century classical composers
20th-century Belgian male musicians
21st-century classical composers
21st-century male musicians
Belgian classical composers
Belgian male classical composers
Belgian opera composers
Composers for carillon
Male opera composers
Postmodern composers
Twelve-tone and serial composers
Writers about music